Pedro Agulto Tenorio (born August 8, 1941), who is often known as Pete A. Tenorio, is a Northern Marianan politician. He served as the fourth Resident representative of the Northern Mariana Islands to the United States from January 14, 2002 to January 3, 2009. A member of the Republican Party, he was elected to the office first in November 2001 and again in November 2005. He served as the second lieutenant governor of the Northern Mariana Islands from January 11, 1982 to January 8, 1990.

Biography
In 2006 he was one of three main elected officials of the CNMI (along with Governor Benigno R. Fitial and Lieutenant Governor Timothy P. Villagomez). The position of Resident Representative, also known locally as "Washington Representative", was established by Article V of the Constitution of the Northern Mariana Islands, and the term of office was four years. The CNMI Resident Representative maintained an office in Washington, D.C. and his expenses were funded by the CNMI government.

Tenorio was the CNMI's fourth and final Resident Representative.  He took office as resident representative on January 14, 2002. He served two terms, until the office was abolished on January 3, 2009.

This office was replaced by a nonvoting delegate in the United States Congress in January 2009. Tenorio was the Republican nominee; however, he lost by 357 votes to Gregorio C. Sablan, an independent.

References

External links
Official CNMI Office of the Resident Representative Pedro A. Tenorio

|-

1941 births
Lieutenant Governors of the Northern Mariana Islands
Living people
Republican Party (Northern Mariana Islands) politicians
Republican Party members of the United States House of Representatives from  the Northern Mariana Islands
Resident Representatives of the Northern Mariana Islands
University of Hawaiʻi alumni